Liyanage Don Leena Piyasili de Silva (born 30 October 1936 as ලීනා ද සිල්වා) [Sinhala]), popularly as Leena de Silva, is an actress in Sri Lankan cinema, theater and television. One of the earliest pillars of Sri Lankan cinema, de Silva has contributed many critically acclaimed films of her generation with a career spanning more than six decades.

Personal life
de Silva was born on 30 October 1936 in Maligakanda, Colombo. Her father, Don Simon de Silva worked as a supervisor at Ceylon Cargo Board Company. Her mother was Alice Silva. She has two sisters, Trilicia Kusuma and Merlyn Thilaka and one brother, Jayampath Sam. She completed education from Ananda Balika Vidyalaya, Kotte.

She was married to fellow actor Ravindra Rupasena from 11 November 1960 to his death in 1978. She met Rupasena during her maiden film Ahankara Sthree and then the couple appeared in many film together, including Surathali, Sohoyuro, Sundara Birinda, Suneetha and Nalagana. The couple has one son and one daughter. Her son, Bimal Yoga Sri was born on 13 September 1961 and daughter Poorna Priyadarshani was born on 1 June 1963. Purna is a talented lyricist.

Rupasena's younger sister was married to film producer Stanley de Silva. Rupasena has one brother, W.A. Keerthisena. Rupasena died from heart attack on 15 April 1978 at the age of 49. At the time of his demise, he was working as a Planner at the Irrigation Department in Colombo. Leena moved to Canada in 1991 and currently lives in Pickering, Ontario with her children.

Career
In the English class of school, de Silva played the lead role in the play Pipe Piper Model. It was her first performance on stage. During school times at the age of 12, she learned dancing from renowned dancer and actor Shesha Palihakkara, who introduced Leena on to the cinema screen. Her maiden cinematic appearance came through 1954 film Ahankara Sthree along with her future husband Ravindra Rupasena while in grade 9 at the school. She performed a dance sequence as Lanka Matha in it. Then Cyril P. Abeyratne was looking for an artiste to play the lead female role in his film Surathali in 1956. In 1955, she won the fifth place at the "Panch Kalyani beauty pageant".

Her husband introduced her to Abeyratne and she acted in his film later that year. She was introduced to Dr. Lester James Peries by guru Palihakkara to act in his film Rekava. However, due to offence from school principal and father, she refused to act in the movie. However, due to sudden death of her husband, de Silva quit from acting for two years and returned with 1980 film Ganga Addara. She acted in many popular films such as, Sundara Birinda, Kele Mal, Awaragira and Yahalu Yeheli. Leena was lucky enough to act along with Rukmani Devi in the film Nalangana.

Apart from cinema, de Silva also acted in few stage dramas such as Thattu Gewal, Dolosweni Raathriya and Julius Caesar. She also appeared in television serials Selalihini Gammanaya, Sudu Parewiyo, Himi Ahimi and Uda Gira. While in Canada, de Silva directed the tele serial Ratakin Ratakata.

Filmography

References

External links
 First Sri Lankan film that ban in screening

1936 births
Sri Lankan film actresses
Sinhalese actresses
Living people